Raj Montana Band is a famous Swedish pop and rock band that also served as a backing band for Swedish singers Dan Hylander and Py Bäckman. The name derives from the band's original name, Ray Montana and his Moonlight Boys. The band dissolved in 1985 but was resurrected in 1997 for a series of reunion tours and a compilation album of earlier hits.

Members
Members of the band has varied over the years. Many of them were part of what in the 1980s as "Studioeliten". But the main setup in the band's heyday (1980–1985) were:

Pelle Alsing - drums 
Clarence Öfwerman - Keyboards 
David Carlson - guitar 
Ola Johansson - bass
Hasse Olsson - organ and keyboards

Other musicians associated with the band on various projects include Mats Ronander, Åke Sundqvist, Mats Englund, Tove Naess, Anne-Lie Rydé, Håkan Nyberg and others.

Discography

Albums
Studio albums

Live albums
1982: Bella Notte
1982: Belle De Jour
1985: Tele-Gram Långt Farväl

Compilation albums

References

Swedish musical groups